The little ground tyrant (Syrtidicola fluviatilis) is a species of bird in the family Tyrannidae, the tyrant flycatchers and is the only species placed in the genus Syrtidicola.
It is found in Amazonian Brazil, Peru, and Bolivia; also smaller regions of Colombia and Ecuador.
Its natural habitats are subtropical or tropical moist shrubland and rivers.

Taxonomy
The little ground tyrant was formerly placed in the genus Muscisaxicola. A genetic study published in 2020 found that it was deeply divergent from other members of Muscisaxicola and was instead sister to the yellow-browed tyrant in the genus Satrapa. The little ground tyrant was therefore moved to a newly erected genus Syrtidicola.

Distribution 
The little ground tyrant is found in the southwest Amazon Basin at higher elevations in the Basins river headwaters. The largest area of range is in the east extending into central and northwest Bolivia, and east of the Madeira River; this entire south Amazon Basin–Bolivian region is much of the headwater tributaries to the Madeira.

From central Bolivia, the range extends north through Amazonian Peru, (only crossing the southwest border areas of Brazil's Amazonas state), and extends downstream on the Marañón River and Amazon River down a riverine wildlife corridor approaching the Juruá River confluence.

Disjunct range locales occur in Ecuador; the species has a restricted-range for the south border region of Colombia along the north shore of the Marañón River, about 150 km.

Behaviour
The little ground tyrant is an insect eater. These birds are often found on open bars on river islands as well as on open grassy areas.  They are sandy gray-brown above with darker wings edged in buff-rust, a blackish tail, white superciliary, thin blackish bill, and off-white underparts.  The little ground tyrant often perches conspicuously on the ground but rarely calls.

References

External links 
 Little ground tyrant photo gallery VIREO Photo-High Res--(Close-up)

little ground tyrant
Birds of the Amazon Basin
Birds of the Peruvian Amazon
Birds of the Bolivian Amazon
little ground tyrant
little ground tyrant
little ground tyrant
Taxonomy articles created by Polbot
Taxobox binomials not recognized by IUCN